The 2023 J3 League, referred to as the  for sponsorship reasons, is the 10th season of the J3 League under its current name.

Changes from the previous season 

Iwaki FC and Fujieda MYFC were promoted to the J2 League after being champions and runners-up of last season's J3.

FC Ryukyu and Iwate Grulla Morioka were relegated from the J2 League after relatively short stints at the 2nd division, with Ryukyu spending four seasons, and Iwate spending just a single season. The clubs finished as 21st and 22nd-placed team at the 2022 J2 League, respectively.

Nara Club and FC Osaka were promoted to the J3 League after being respectively, champions and runners-up of last season's JFL. Both teams are making their debut in the J3 League after obtaining a J.League License, to enable their promotion from the JFL.

Overview

Promotion and relegation 
This season will be the first to feature promotion/relegation from the Japan Football League, enabling the possibility for teams to be relegated from the J3. The system of promotion/relegation between the leagues can be determined by the eligibility (Promotion to J3 requires a J.League license) of the JFL's champions and runners-up for the season.

If only the JFL champions holds a license, there will be automatic promotion/relegation with the J3's 20th-placed team.

If only the JFL runners-up holds a license, there will be promotion/relegation play-offs with the J3's 20th-placed team.

If both the JFL champions and runners-up hold a license, there will be automatic promotion/relegation between the JFL champions and the J3's 20th-placed team, and promotion/relegation play-offs with the J3's 19th-placed team.

If both the JFL champions and runners-up do not hold a license, no promotion/relegation between J3 and JFL will take place.

The dates and the host teams of the promotion/relegation play-off were pre-determined by the J.League. In case it happens, it will be played in two legs on 9 and 16 December, with the J3 team hosting the second leg.

Participating clubs

Personnel and kits

Managerial changes

Transfers 

The winter transfer window will go from 6 January to 31 March, while the summer transfer window will go from 21 July to 18 August.

Foreign players 
From the 2021 season onwards, there is no limitations on signing foreign players, but clubs could only register up to five of them for a single matchday squad. Players from J.League partner nations (Thailand, Vietnam, Myanmar, Malaysia, Cambodia, Singapore, Indonesia, and Qatar) were exempted from these restrictions.

Players name in bold indicates the player is registered during the mid-season transfer window.
Player's name in italics indicates the player has Japanese nationality in addition to their FIFA nationality, holds the nationality of a J.League partner nation, or is exempt from being treated as a foreign player due to having been born in Japan and being enrolled in, or having graduated from an approved type of school in the country.

League table

Play-offs

J3/JFL Promotion/Relegation Playoffs 
2023 J3/JFL play-offs (2023 J3・JFL入れ替え戦)
J3's 19th-placed team will face 2023 Japan Football League runners-up in a two-legged playoff series.

Stadiums 
Primary venues to be used in the 2023 J3 League season:

Season statistics

Goal contributions

Top scorers

Top assists

Clean sheets

Discipline

Player
Most yellow cards: 2
  Mu Kanazaki (FC Ryukyu)

 Most red cards: 1 
  Mu Kanazaki (FC Ryukyu)

Club
 Most yellow cards: 5  (Ehime FC and Kataller Toyama)
 Most red cards: 1  (FC Ryukyu)

References

External links
Official website, JLeague.jp 

J3 League seasons
3
Japan
Japan